Acanthurus grammoptilus is a tropical fish which is found in the Philippines, Indonesia and Australia. Also known, commonly, as the finelined-surgeonfish, it is used commercially in fisheries, and can be used for food.

References

Acanthurus
Fish described in 1843